Schilling & Graebner (or Gräbner) was an architecture firm based in Dresden, Germany, founded by the architects Rudolf Schilling (1859–1933) and Julius Graebner (1858–1917) in 1889. The firm was under their direction from 1889 until Graebner's death, but continued to exist until 1947, most notably under Graebner's son Erwin (1895–1945). The firm, which initially devoted itself primarily to historicism and later to Art Nouveau and early modernism, worked on mainly buildings in Saxony, including several noteworthy churches, Dresden villas, administrative buildings and entire residential districts. One of the firms' most important works is the Christuskirche in Dresden (1903—05), which arguably marks the transition of sacral architecture in Germany from historicism to modernity.

Early Life and Formation of the Partnership
 Both Schilling and Graebner had met each other when they were just over 20 years old around 1881 while studying architecture at the Polytechnikum Dresden. Even when they initially went their separate ways after completing their training, they did not lose touch, especially since they both worked in Berlin in two different offices in the mid-1880s. The two architects, who were roughly the same age, complemented each other very well. Together they were a formidable and very versatile team, as evidenced by the fact that they not only designed very complex buildings, but they also showed great stylistic differences amongst their entire oeuvre. Schilling, as the son of the well-known sculptor Johannes Schilling, provided the necessary start-up capital and contacts to numerous potential clients. Graebner's strength, on the other hand, was more artistic design.

 Schilling and Graebner hired several trained architects in their firm over the years, including Oswald Bieber, Heino Otto and Johannes Rascher. During the late nineteenth century, their biggest local competitors were probably William Lossow and Fritz Schumacher. At that time, Schilling and Graebner were the leading architects of the fifth largest city in the German Empire. They were generally considered within the first rank of German architects and were particularly regarded as experts in contemporary Protestant church architecture. They were also inspired in their work by suggestions from Franz Wilhelm Dibelius and Cornelius Gurlitt.

Stylistic Evolution

 At first, Schilling & Graebner preferred late historicism in their works in Dresden. Their first building commission, the Pieschen town hall, completed in 1891, shows clear features of the Neo-Renaissance, as well as the Villa Muttersegen built in 1891 in Blasewitz or the Lutherkirche in Radebeul. In the years before the turn of the century, Schilling and Graebner also designed neo-baroque buildings, such the commercial building called the Imperial Palace for Hermann Ilgen at Pirnaischer Platz that burned in 1945 during the bombing of Dresden and was later demolished. In 1895 they also designed the neo-baroque interior of the Schellenberger City Church of St. Peter, which was destroyed after a fire. and around 1900 that of the Dresden Kreuzkirche. The latter also showed a significant influence from Jugendstil. For a long time, Schilling and Graebner represented the views in line with the development of Heimatschutz Architecture as it emerged around the turn of the century.

With their practice flourishing, in 1899 Schilling and Graebner bought the large winery of Altfriedstein in the present Radebeul district of Dresden and developed the site by laying roads and parcelling the abandoned wine-growing areas into a "Villa Colony Altfriedstein." To do this, they tore down the west wing of the mansion and all the outbuildings of the winery and redesigned the west gable of the remaining east wing. Among other things, they built a pedestrian passage through the corner of the building on the ground floor. From 1902 until the First World War they built numerous villas and country houses there, many of them in the Heimatschutzstil, also called the "Reform Architecture Style."

After about 1902, Schilling and Graebner tried to overcome historicism and turned more to a kind of proto-modernism, which was particularly difficult in church building due to the Eisenach regulations that applied there. The first signs of modernity are the residential buildings built in the early twentieth century for the Dresdner Spar- und Bauverein with their austere facades and high functionality. The Christuskirche in Strehlen, built in 1903—05, went far beyond Art Nouveau and points in this direction, which is also very clearly expressed in the Zionskirche in the Dresden Südvorstadt built in 1912—14, but partially destroyed in 1945. This pioneering work also meant that the two architects were invited to join several professional associations. Graebner was member of the directorate of the Dürerbund. As members of the Deutscher Werkbund Schilling and Graebner designed many of their later villas, public and sacral buildings according to the principles of modernity as propagated by this association of artists and industry. The former Zionskirche, built from 1908—12 and destroyed in 1945, was an extraordinary example of this architectural style. However, despite this general line of evolution, it is worth noting Schilling and Graebner also liked to experiment with mixtures of styles.

Work after 1917
 After Julius Graebner died in 1917, the firm was continued by his son Erwin Graebner, who returned from the Western Front in October 1918, and replaced his father in partnership with Rudolf Schilling. During this period, further plans for larger buildings such as the Kriegersiedlung in Trachau and the development on the west side of Aachener Strasse in Dresden were implemented. Schilling died in 1933 and Erwin Graebner ran the office alone from then on. During this time he developed, among other things, the plans for several factory buildings of the Leipziger Kammgarnspinnerei, which were blown up in 2007 and captured on video. In 1947, two years after Erwin Graebner's death, the firm was finally dissolved.

Selected works

Villas
 Goetheallee 24 (Pernwaldhaus/Villa Muttersegen), Blasewitz, begun 1891, Neo-Renaissance
 Goetheallee 26 (:de:Villa Fliederhof), built in 1891, burned down and demolished in 1979
 Kaitzer Str. 82, Dresden-Plauen, built in 1891, renovated in 1999 
 Barteldesplatz 2, Blasewitz, 1893, Neo-Renaissance style, today the seat of the Bürgerstiftung Dresden
 Goetheallee 43, Blasewitz, 1894, eclectic
 Extension to the Villa Zillerstraße 5, Niederlößnitz, 1895
 :de:Villa Friedrichsruh, Hermsdorfer Straße 16, Löbtau, 1898
 :de:Villa Rautendelein for Gerhart Hauptmann, Hochuferstraße 12 (today Käthe-Kollwitz-Ufer 84), Blasewitz, 1899–1900, destroyed in 1945
 Franz-Liszt-Strasse 19, Strehlen, 1899
 Hähnelstraße 13, Johannstadt, four-story country house, destroyed
 Degelestraße 3 (Villa Wolff), Weißer Hirsch, 1901, Neo-Baroque
 Residential colony Altfriedstein in the Niederlößnitz district of Radebeul, from 1902
 Conversion of the mansion Altfriedstein, 1902
 Villa at Prof.-Wilhelm-Ring 20, 1902
 Landhaus Ludwig-Richter-Allee 27, 1902—03
 Country house Prof.-Wilhelm-Ring 16 (Radebeul), 1903
 Hermann Ebert tenement house, Moritzburger Strasse 45, 1903
 Villa Elisabeth's peace, Prof.-Wilhelm-Ring 10, 1903
 House at Lindenaustrasse 7 (Radebeul), 1903—04
 House Schilling, Auenstraße 51, Apolda, Thuringia, 1904—06
 Detached house at Ludwig-Richter-Allee 30, 1905
 Detached house at Ludwig-Richter-Allee 31, 1905—06
 Detached house at Ludwig-Richter-Allee 32, 1905—06
 Detached house at Ludwig-Richter-Allee 33, 1905—06
 Paul Nieschke House, Ludwig-Richter-Allee 28, 1906
 Landhaus Lutzmann House, Lindenaustrasse 3, 1906
 Landhaus Prof.-Wilhelm-Ring 18, 1906
 Villa Alfred Sparbert, Prof.-Wilhelm-Ring 19, 1907
 Landhaus Altfriedstein 7, 1910
 Meyerburg, Mohrenstrasse 5, 1911—12
 Landhaus Lindenaustrasse 1, 1916—17
 Villa Würzburger, Johannstadt, 1910

Churches

 
 Lutherkirche (Radebeul), Neo-Renaissance, 1891 (with neighboring vicarage and the associated cemetery chapel on the Friedhof Radebeul-Ost)
 Church in :de:Hohenfichte, 1893–96
 Interior of the Church of St. Peter in Schellenberg, Neo-Baroque, 1895
 Resurrection Church in Stenn, 1895–96
 Competition design for the new church in Leuben, 1898, 2nd prize, not executed
 New interior of the burnt out Kreuzkirche in Dresden, 1897–1900, destroyed during the Second World War except for small remains
 Conversion of the evangelical church in Cannewitz, 1900
 New tower of the evangelical church in Bergen (Vogtland), 1900
 Protective porch for the Golden Gate at the Freiberg Cathedral, 1902
 Christ Church (so-called “Green Church”) in Teplice, (now Czech Republic), 1899–1905, Art Nouveau, demolished 1973
 Lutherkirche in Dux, 1899–1901
 Churches in Hohenelbe and Klostergrab, 1900–03
 Church of the German Evangelical Congregation in Mittel Langenau, 1902, elevated to a parish church in 1916, demolished in 1979
 St. Trinity Church in Wiesa (Ore Mountains), 1902–1904
 Christuskirche in Dresden-Strehlen, 1903–05
 Cemetery chapel in Rochlitz, 1905
 Lutherkirche in Zwickau, Art Nouveau, built in 1906 as a garrison church
 Reconstruction of the cruciform church in Hirschberg in the Giant Mountains, 1909
 Conversion of the Jakobikirche in Chemnitz, redesign of the west facade, Art Nouveau, 1911
 Zionskirche, Südvorstadt, Dresden, 1912–14
 Peace Church in Aue-Zelle, 1912–14
 Design for a Protestant parish church in Schinkel near Osnabrück, published in 1915
 Design for a Protestant parish church in :de:Reumtengrün near Auerbach/Vogtl., published in 1915
 Villa Würzburger, Johannstadt, 1910

Houses in Dresden

 Leipziger Strasse 32—34, :de:Leipziger Vorstadt, residential buildings for the Dresdner Spar- und Bauverein, 1901, sparsely decorated and functionalist
 Coschützer Strasse 54—56, Plauen, residential buildings for the Dresden Spar- und Bauverein, 1902, sparsely decorated and functionalist
 Warrior settlement Dresden-Trachau, 1921–26,
 Trachau housing estate, together with Hans Richter, Hans Waloschek and others, 1928–39, especially rows of houses on Aachener Straße
 "Rudolf-Schilling-Haus" on Holbeinstrasse and Tittmannstrasse, today the Johannstadt housing association
 Reick settlement, together with :de:Rudolf Bitzan and others

Other Buildings and Projects
 Expansion of the facilities of the Sonnenstein Sanitary Home in Pirna (from 1890)
 Old :de:Friedhofskapelle Friedhof Radebeul-Ost, 1890
 Pieschen Town Hall, 1890–91
 Commercial building Kaiserpalast for Hermann Ilgen on Pirnaischer Platz in Dresden, 1896, neo-baroque style, burned 1945, demolished 1951
 Löbtau Town Hall, 1896–98, destroyed
 Draft of a restoration building in the form of a Japanese Rococo pavilion for the 1897 German Art Exhibition in Dresden
 Hotel Ratskeller in Schwarzenberg (reconstruction of the burnt down town hall, 1906)
 Draft for the portal to the arts and crafts department and large hall for the German Art Exhibition in 1899
 Wine salon Stadt Gotha in Dresden-Altstadt, Schloßstraße 11, 1900, destroyed
 Sächsische Handelsbank, Ringstraße 10/12, Dresden-Altstadt, 1900
 Coffee shop Max Thürmer in the Viktoriahaus, Waisenhausstraße, Dresden-Altstadt, 1901, destroyed
 Wettin Fountain in Waldheim (Saxony), 1902–03
 AOK administration building at Sternplatz in Dresden, :de:Wilsdruffer Vorstadt, 1912–13
 Consecration hall, mortuary, gardener's house and gate at the St. Pauli Cemetery in Dresden, 1909
 Exhibition stand for the Rother'sche Kunstziegeleien GmbH / Ceramic art workshops Richard Mutz & Rother GmbH from Liegnitz (Lower Silesia) at the II. German Clay, Cement and Lime Industry Exhibition  in Berlin-Baumschulenweg
 Spa center Bad Gottleuba, 1909–13, 34 Art Nouveau buildings
 Some buildings of the :de:Lahmann Sanatorium in Dresden-Weißer Hirsch, 1912
 Dyeing and sorting building of Kammgarnspinnerei AG in Leipzig, Dr.-Kurt-Fischer-Straße 31, 1934–36, demolished in 2007

Further reading 
 Ricarda Kube, "Schilling und Graebner (1889–1917) – Das Werk einer Dresdner Architektenfirma." Dissertation an der Technischen Universität Dresden, 2 volumes, 1988.
 Landkirchen. Entworfen und ausgeführt von den Architekten Schilling & Graebner. Mit einem Geleitwort von Dr. Paul Schumann. Leipzig, Gilbertsche Verlagsbuchhandlung, 1903.
 Guy Eglinton, Peyton Boswell: International studio, Vol. 13. New York Offices of the International Studio, 1901, pp. 283, 284.
 Ralph Adams Cram: Christian art: an illustrated monthly magazine devoted to current church building, American and foreign, and the allied ecclesiological arts, with expert discussions of all topics relating to Christian archaeology, Vol. 4. R.S. Badger, 1908, pp 14–18.
 Schilling und Graebner, Architekten BDA, Dresden. Eine Auswahl. Bauten von 1918–1928. Maximilian Maul, Berlin 1928.
 Volker Helas, ed., Stadt Radebeul. Beucha: Sax-Verlag/Landesamt für Denkmalpflege Sachsen, Große Kreisstadt Radebeul, 2007, .
 Tobias Michael Wolf, Die Villenkolonie Altfriedstein in Niederlößnitz / Radebeul. Werk der Dresdner Architektenfirma Schilling & Graebner. (Magisterarbeit, Technische Universität Dresden, 2005) VDM Verlag Dr. Müller, Saarbrücken 2008. (Book-on-Demand)

References

External links 

 Schilling & Graebner at Europeana
 Protestantischer Kirchenbau von Schilling & Graebner (PDF; 925 kB)

Architecture firms of Germany
Companies based in Dresden
Art Nouveau architects
Modernist architects
Design companies established in 1889
Design companies disestablished in 1947
1889 establishments in Germany
1947 disestablishments in Germany